Even in the Quietest Moments... is the fifth album by the English rock band Supertramp, released in April 1977. It was recorded mainly at Caribou Ranch Studios in Colorado with overdubs, vocals, and mixing completed at The Record Plant in Los Angeles. This was Supertramp's first album to use engineer Peter Henderson, who would work with the band for their next three albums as well.

Even in the Quietest Moments… reached number 16 on the Billboard Pop Albums Chart in 1977 and within a few months of release became Supertramp's first Gold (500,000 copies or more) selling album in the US. In addition, "Give a Little Bit" became a US Top 20 single and reached number 29 on the UK Singles Chart. While "Give a Little Bit" was the big hit, both "Fool's Overture" and the title track also got a fair amount of FM album-rock play.

In 1978, Even in the Quietest Moments… was ranked 63rd in The World Critic Lists, which recognised the 200 greatest albums of all time as voted for by notable rock critics and DJs.

Background and recording
Though all the songs are credited as being written jointly by Rick Davies and Roger Hodgson, Davies wrote "Lover Boy", "Downstream", and "From Now On" by himself, and Hodgson in turn wrote "Give a Little Bit", "Even in the Quietest Moments", "Babaji", and "Fool's Overture" unaided.

Davies said of "Lover Boy" that "I was inspired by advertisements in men's magazines telling you how to pick up women. You know, you send away for it and it's guaranteed not to fail. If you haven't slept with at least five women in two weeks, you can get your money back." Bob Siebenberg recounted that "Rick had been working on 'Lover Boy' for quite a while and finally came up with the long middle section. I just heard that as a really slow, really solid sort of beat, just to give the song dynamics underneath it all, because the song itself is really powerful and it needed something really solid underneath it."

Most of "Even in the Quietest Moments" was written during the sound check for a show at the Tivoli Gardens (in Copenhagen). Davies and Hodgson worked out the various parts of the song with Hodgson using an Oberheim and a Solina string synthesiser and Davies at the drum kit. Davies commented on the music: "It starts off in a very standard melody thing and then it notches onto a sort of one chord progression or perhaps we should call it a digression. It's a thing where there's hundreds of sounds coming in and going out, a whole collage thing." Hodgson said of the lyrics: "It's kind of a dual love song – it could be to a girl or it could be to God."  Gary Graff of Billboard rated "Even in the Quietest Moments" as Supertramp's 4th best song.

"Downstream" is performed solely by Davies on vocal and piano, which were recorded together in one take. Siebenberg has described the song as his favourite on the album "because it's so personal and so pure."

Graff rated "From Now On" as Supertramp's 8th best song, highlighting John Helliwell’s saxophone solo and the call-and-response singalong at the end.

"Fool's Overture" had the working title of "The String Machine Epic", and according to John Helliwell: "It came primarily from a few melodies Roger worked out on the string machine thing we use on stage." Hodgson stated the song's lyrics are essentially meaningless, explaining: "I like being vague and yet saying enough to set people's imaginations running riot." Written and sung by guitarist/keyboardist Roger Hodgson - who took five years to compose it - the song is a collage of progressive instrumentation and sound samples. First are excerpts of Winston Churchill's famous 4 June 1940 House of Commons speech regarding Britain's involvement in World War II ("Never Surrender"), followed by sounds of police cars and bells from London's Big Ben clock tower. The flageolet-sounding instrument plays an excerpt from Gustav Holst's "Venus", from his orchestral suite The Planets. There is also a reading of the first verse of William Blake's poem "And did those feet in ancient time" (more commonly known as "Jerusalem"), ended by a short sample of the band's song "Dreamer". Ultimate Classic Rock critic Nick DeRiso rated it as Supertramp's 7th best song."

Artwork
The front cover is a photo of an actual snow-covered piano and bench with a scenic mountain peak backdrop—an actual, but gutted, grand piano was brought to the Eldora Mountain Resort (a ski area near Caribou Ranch Studios)—which was left overnight and photographed after a fresh snow. The sheet music on the piano, though titled "Fool's Overture", is actually "The Star-Spangled Banner".

A remastered CD version of the album with full original artwork, lyrics, and credits restored (including the inner sleeve picture of the band absent from the original CD) was released on 11 June 2002 on A&M Records in the US.

Critical reception

In Christgau's Record Guide: Rock Albums of the Seventies (1981), Robert Christgau remarked that, unlike most progressive rock, which is "pretentious background schlock that's all too hard to ignore", the album is "modest background schlock that sounds good when it slips into the ear."

AllMusic gave a mixed retrospective review of the album, calling it "elegant yet mildly absurd, witty but kind of obscure," but adding that it "places a greater emphasis on melody and gentle textures than any previous Supertramp release." They criticised the album as not being "full formed," but marked "Give a Little Bit," "Lover Boy," "Fool's Overture," and "From Now On" as worthy of praise.

Track listing
All songs credited to Rick Davies and Roger Hodgson. Listed below are the actual writers, also lead singers of their songs.

1997 and 2002 A&M reissue
The 1997 and 2002 A&M Records reissues were mastered from the original master tapes by Greg Calbi and Jay Messina at Sterling Sound, New York, in 1997 and 2002. The reissues were supervised by Bill Levenson with art direction by Vartan and design by Mike Diehl, with production coordination by Beth Stempel.

Personnel

Supertramp
 Roger Hodgson – vocals, 12-string guitar (tracks 1, 3) electric guitar (tracks 1, 2, 5, 6), piano (tracks 5, 7), synthesizers (track 7), pump organ (track 7)
 Rick Davies – vocals, piano (tracks 1, 2, 4, 6, 7), organ (tracks 1, 3, 6), synthesizers (tracks 2, 3, 5, 7), clavinet (track 1), electric piano (track 6), melodica (track 6)
 Dougie Thomson – bass (tracks 1-3, 5-7)
 John Helliwell – saxophones (tracks 1, 2, 5-7), clarinets (track 3)
 Bob Siebenberg (credited as Bob C. Benberg) – drums and percussion (tracks 1-3, 5-7)

Production
Supertramp –  producers, orchestral arrangements
Peter Henderson –  engineer
Tom Anderson –  assistant engineer, remixing
Tom Likes –  assistant engineer
Steve Smith –  assistant engineer
Geoff Emerick –  mixing engineer
Russel Pope –  concert sound engineer
Garey Mielke – Oberheim programming
Michel Colombier, Supertramp –  orchestral arrangements
Mike Doud –  art direction and design
Bob Seidemann –  photography
Kenneth McGowan – inner sleeve photography
Frank DeLuna –  mastering on original LP
Greg Calbi –  remastering
Jay Messina –  remastering

Charts

Weekly charts

Year-end charts

Certifications and sales

References

Supertramp albums
1977 albums
A&M Records albums
Albums produced by Rick Davies
Albums produced by Roger Hodgson